Ralph Louis McGill (April 28, 1950 – March 21, 2015) was a professional American football safety in the National Football League for the San Francisco 49ers and the New Orleans Saints.  He played college football at the University of Tulsa. He died in 2015.

References

External links
NFL.com player page

1950 births
2015 deaths
People from Thomasville, Georgia
Players of American football from Georgia (U.S. state)
African-American players of American football
American football safeties
Tulsa Golden Hurricane football players
San Francisco 49ers players
New Orleans Saints players
20th-century African-American sportspeople
21st-century African-American people